D for Dopidi is a 2013 Telugu-language heist comedy film directed by Siraj Kalla starring Varun Sandesh, Sundeep Kishan, Naveen Polishetty and Melanie Kannokada. It was co-produced by Raj Nidimoru and Krishna D.K. and Telugu star Nani, who also lent his voice as the narrator and did a promo video. Mahesh Shankar composed the music. The film released on 25 December 2013. It received mixed feedback from critics but the majority audience enjoyed this new kind of cinema.

Plot

Vicky (Varun Sandesh), Raju (Sundeep Kishan), Harish (Naveen Polishetty) and Bannu (Rakesh), the four central characters in the film, need money desperately to overcome their problems. Each one has his own story. After having looked into other avenues for a solution, they finally embark upon an ignoble bank robbery. Everything goes according to plan till they enter the bank where they are confronted by another gang of robbers led by Lokamuddhu (Thanikella Bharani). Trouble starts as things get horribly messed up. What happens next – are they successful in their heist and are able to get rid of their problems finally – forms, predictably enough, the crux of the story.

Cast
 Varun Sandesh as Vicky
 Sundeep Kishan as Raju
 Naveen Polishetty as Harish
 Rakesh Rachakonda as Bannu
 Melanie Kannokada as Shalini
 Tanikella Bharani as Lokamuddhu
 Deva Katta as A.C.P. Krishnamachari
 Hema as Bank Assistant Manager
 Pippalla Raj as Rutherford
 Rishi Muvva
 Josh Ravi as Bank Attender
 Pavala Syamala as Bank Attender's mother

Soundtrack
The film's soundtrack was composed by Mahesh Shankar and the duo Sachin–Jigar, marking their Telugu debut. The soundtrack album was released by Aditya Music. The song "Meher Meher" was later reused by Sachin–Jigar for the Hindi movie Happy Ending as "Jaise Mera Tu" crooned by Arijit Singh and Priya Saraiya which then became a chartbuster.

Reception
Reports say the film was made on a budget of  & the publicity budget was  5 million. It was heard that the film's Satellite rights were sold for by Gemini TV.

Given these statistics, it appears that the film has run into profits right from the day of its release.

The curious case of "D For Dopidi" baffled many. The majority of the audience and a few top critics loved the film and appreciated the different style and humour presented in the film. Jeevi of idlebrain.com reviewed "If you like the crime comedy angle in films like Money, Kshana Kshanam and Anaganaga Oka Roju, you are going to love 'D for Dopidi'. You may watch it!" by giving a rating of 3.25 on a scale of 5. In contrast, many of the reviewers were not impressed. This film showed the divide between the audience and critics as to how some welcome the change in Telugu cinema and the rest resist.

References

External links
 

2013 films
2010s Telugu-language films
Indian heist films